Lamippidae is a family of copepods belonging to the order Cyclopoida.

Genera:
 Enalcyonium Olsson, 1869
 Gorgonophilus Buhl-Mortensen & Mortensen, 2004
 Isidicola Gravier, 1914
 Lamipella Bouligand & Delamare Deboutteville, 1959
 Lamippe Bruzelius, 1858
 Lamippella Bouligand & Delamare Deboutteville, 1959
 Lamippina Bouligand, 1960
 Lamippula Bouligand, 1966
 Linaresia Zulueta, 1908
 Magnippe Stock, 1978
 Ptilosarcoma Williams, Anchaluisa, Boyko & McDaniel, 2018
 Sphaerippe Grygier, 1980

References

Copepods